Hala-Bala Wildlife Sanctuary is a wildlife sanctuary in Thailand, considered to be one of the richest forests of Thailand in the southernmost part of the country. It is dubbed "Amazon of Asean".  It was officially established in 1996. Its area is about 270,725 rais (about 167.244 mi2) which covers the area of Titiwangsa Range and is adjacent to  Belum-Temengor Reserve of Malaysia.

The Hala-Bala Wildlife Sanctuary is a preserved forest comprising two forestland: Hala forest in Betong district in Yala province and Chanae district in Narathiwat province, with Bala forest in Waeng and Sukhirin districts in Narathiwat province. For Waeng people, it is called "Bala-Hala", but for locals in Betong, it is called "Hala-Bala".

The forest was named after Khlong Bala, a natural khlong (canal) that flows into the Bang Lang Reservoir in Yala, which is a large stream originating from a tropical rainforest with tributaries from the Hala Mountaintop. It features a watershed forest situated in the deep forest adjacent to the Malaysian border and is home to various wild animals. Rare preserved wild animals have been traced as a variety of hornbill species have been covered. Seasonally, flocks of a hundred to a thousand hornbills are found in the area. In particular, there are large and small flocks of plain-pouched hornbill (Rhyticeros subruficollis) annually migrating from the Huai Kha Khaeng  Wildlife Sanctuary in central and western regions to this area in May, which number about 500 or more in total. Hala-Bala  is also a habitat of up to 10 hornbills from a total of 13 species found in Thailand, such as rhinoceros hornbill (Buceros rhinoceros) that can be closely seen along the Ban To Mo-Ban Bala route, including rare species helmeted hornbill (Rhinoplax vigil) as well.

Also, large wild animals like gaurs (Bos gaurus) are often found in the grassland by Khlong Bala. All of these point that the Hala forest is a complete tropical rainforest that is enriched by plants, wildlife, and a variety of bird species including biodiversity, which maintain the balance of nature in this forest. In the part of rare plants that can be found in this forest, for example golden leaved liana, or locally called Yan Da-o (Bauhinia aureifolia), an endemic plant in Thailand found only in Narathiwat, Yala, and Pattani provinces. Maha Sadam (Cyathea podophylla), a kind of fern, used to be food of dinosaurs that can make feels like returning to a primeval forest, and is a home of largest baing tree (Tetrameles nudiflora) in Thailand as well.

See also
List of protected areas of Thailand

References

External links

Wildlife sanctuaries of Thailand
1996 establishments in Thailand
Protected areas established in 1996
Geography of Yala province
Geography of Narathiwat province